The 2017–18 Premier League was the 26th season of the Premier League, the top English professional league for association football clubs, since its establishment in 1992, and the 119th season of top-flight English football overall. The season started on 11 August 2017 and concluded on 13 May 2018. Fixtures for the 2017–18 season were announced on 14 June 2017. Chelsea were the defending champions, while Newcastle United, Brighton & Hove Albion and Huddersfield Town entered as the promoted teams from the 2016–17 EFL Championship.

Manchester City won their third Premier League title, and fifth English top-flight title overall, with five games to spare. The team broke numerous Premier League records over the course of the season, including: most points (100), most wins (32), most away wins (16), most goals (106), most consecutive league wins (18), highest goal difference (+79), fewest minutes behind in matches (153 minutes) and biggest winning points margin (19). All three promoted clubs avoided relegation for the first time since the 2011–12 campaign, and for only the third time in Premier League history.

Overview

Sleeve sponsorship 
From this season on, club strips could feature sleeve sponsorship, whereby sponsors' logos would appear on the left sleeve of the strip in lieu of the Premier League patch.

Deception by simulation 
From this season on, a three-man panel consisting of a former player, a former manager and a former match official would independently review video evidence on the Monday after games. Any player whom the three-man panel unanimously decided had caused an opponent to be sent off or had won a penalty as a result of deceiving the referee by simulation would be charged by the Football Association with "Successful Deception of a Match Official" which carried a penalty of suspension for two matches. Everton striker Oumar Niasse became the first Premier League player to be punished under the new rule.

Summary 
Manchester City were confirmed as Premier League champions following Manchester United's 0–1 defeat at home to West Bromwich Albion in the 33rd round. Manchester City had started the Premier League season with an away win over Brighton & Hove Albion in August. After a draw against Everton, Manchester City won eighteen games in a row. During this time they secured first position and held it for the remainder of the season. On 7 April, Manchester City hosted Manchester United in the local derby, in which a win would have secured their position as champions. United came back from 2–0 down at half-time to win 3–2 and deny their rivals the title; however, the following week they lost to bottom club West Bromwich Albion, a result which, coupled with Manchester City's victory over Tottenham Hotspur, ensured an unassailable lead with five games left.

During the campaign Manchester City broke and set several new club and English football records. They established national records in consecutive away (11) and overall (20) victories in all competitions; set a new English record for consecutive league wins (18); equalled the Premier League record for consecutive away league wins (11) and set club records by achieving 28 consecutive games unbeaten in all competitions; 30 consecutive games unbeaten in the league; 20 consecutive home wins in all competitions; and winning 14 away games in a season. They won their fifth English league title, and completed their second league and League Cup double in four years.

Defending champions Chelsea started the season badly, losing their opening game to Burnley 2–3; the first time the holders were defeated at home in their first match. A win at one of the title favourites, Tottenham, in their second game seemed to get their defence back on track, but results in September, including losing 0–1 to Manchester City, left them six points behind the leaders in fourth place. They failed to show the consistency of the previous season, and finished in fifth place, leading to Antonio Conte's dismissal as manager a year after leading them to the title. 

Manchester United started the season strongly winning their first three games without conceding a goal and led the table until mid-September. They finished in 2nd, their highest finish and points total (81) since the departure of Sir Alex Ferguson. 

Liverpool finished fourth for a second consecutive season, buoyed by the signing of Mohamed Salah; his 32 goals broke a Premier League record for most goals scored in a 38-game season, beating the 31 achieved by Cristiano Ronaldo, Alan Shearer and Luis Suarez. 

Arsenal had a poor season, finishing sixth overall. Long-serving manager Arsène Wenger announced his departure from the club on 20 April 2018. Their final home game was an emphatic 5–0 defeat of Burnley which guaranteed qualification to the group stage of the Europa League.

Despite the defeat, Burnley finished in seventh place, their best finish in English football since 1973–74. This meant they would be entered into the second qualifying round of the Europa League, their first competitive European football campaign in 50 years. Their strong finish led to manager Sean Dyche and defender James Tarkowski being nominated for the Premier League Manager of the Season and Premier League Player of the Season awards respectively.

Stoke City were the first team to be relegated to the EFL Championship when they lost 1–2 to Crystal Palace in their penultimate game. Although Stoke were only three points from safety with one game remaining, fellow strugglers Swansea and Southampton still had to play each other, meaning that Stoke would be unable to catch both of those teams and finish fourth from bottom. The game between Swansea and Southampton ended in a 1–0 away win for Southampton, which also meant that despite a five-game unbeaten run, West Bromwich Albion became the second team to be relegated to the Championship on 8 May 2018. Following their 1–2 defeat at the hands of Stoke on the final matchday, Swansea City were also relegated. This meant that all three promoted teams, Newcastle United, Brighton & Hove Albion and Huddersfield Town, survived relegation for the first time since the 2011–12 campaign.

Teams 
Twenty teams competed in the league – the top seventeen teams from the previous season and the three teams promoted from the Championship. The promoted teams were Newcastle United, Brighton & Hove Albion and Huddersfield Town, returning to the top flight after an absence of one, thirty-four and forty-five years respectively. This was also both Brighton & Hove Albion and Huddersfield Town's first season in the Premier League. They replaced Hull City, Middlesbrough (both teams relegated after a season's presence) and Sunderland (relegated after ten years in the top flight).

Stadiums and locations

Note: Table lists in alphabetical order. Source:

Personnel and kits 

 Additionally, referee kits were made by Nike, sponsored by EA Sports, and Nike had a new match ball, the Ordem V Premier League.

Managerial changes

League table

Results

Season statistics

Scoring

Top scorers

Hat-tricks 

Notes
4 Player scored 4 goals(H) – Home team(A) – Away team

Clean sheets

Discipline

Player 

 Most yellow cards: 11
  Oriol Romeu (Southampton)

 Most red cards: 2
  Wilfred Ndidi (Leicester City)
  Jonjo Shelvey (Newcastle United)

Club 

 Most yellow cards: 73
 West Bromwich Albion
 West Ham United

 Most red cards: 5
 Leicester City

Awards

Monthly awards

Annual awards

Attendances

References

External links 
 Official website

 
Premier League seasons
Eng
1